Paremhat 13 - Coptic Calendar - Paremhat 15

The fourteenth day of the Coptic month of Paremhat, the seventh month of the Coptic year. In common years, this day corresponds to March 10, of the Julian Calendar, and March 23, of the Gregorian Calendar. This day falls in the Coptic Season of Shemu, the season of the Harvest.

Commemorations

Martyrs 

 The martyrdom of the Bishops Eugenius, Agathodorus, and Elpidius 
 The martyrdom of Saint Shenouda of Bahnasa

Saints 

 The departure of Pope Cyril III, the 75th Patriarch of the See of Saint Mark

References 

Days of the Coptic calendar